The 1987–88 Alabama Crimson Tide men's basketball team represented the University of Alabama in the 1987–88 NCAA Division I men's basketball season. The team's head coach was Wimp Sanderson, who was in his eighth season at Alabama. The team played their home games at Coleman Coliseum in Tuscaloosa, Alabama. They finished the season with a record of 14–17, 6–12 in conference, finishing in a tie for eighth place. It was the Tide's first non-winning season since the 1971–72 season.

The Tide suffered heavy losses in the 1987 offseason. Forward Derrick McKey declared early for the NBA Draft after his junior season. Forward Jim Farmer graduated and was also drafted into the NBA. Also, guards James Jackson, Terry Coner, and Mark Gottfried all graduated. The Tide signed freshman forward Melvin Cheatum and freshman guards Gary Waites and Bryant Lancaster to try and offset the losses. Also, junior college transfer Alvin Lee, who the previous season led the NJCAA in scoring, was also signed.

The Tide lost in the first round of the SEC tournament to Ole Miss. The team failed to make the NCAA tournament for the first time since 1982 and failed to reach any postseason play for the first time since 1978.

Roster

References 

Alabama Crimson Tide men's basketball seasons
Alabama
1987 in sports in Alabama
1988 in sports in Alabama